FC Oberneuland Bremen von 1948 is a German association football club from the Oberneuland quarter of Bremen, founded on 13 April 1948 in the local inn Zum Dorfkrug as Fußball-Club Oberneuland von 1948. In addition to football, the club has departments for basketball and gymnastics.



History
For most of its history FC Oberneuland played as a lower-tier local side until breaking out in the early 1990s and rising rapidly through a series of title wins. By 1994, the club had advanced to the Verbandsliga Bremen (V) and, after a second-place result, went on to capture the division title the following season. They were promoted to the Oberliga Niedersachsen/Bremen (IV) where they played until 2004 when they were dropped to fifth-tier play after league re-organization. Oberneuland returned to fourth division play in the Oberliga Nord in 2006 after their second Verbandsliga title.

Bremer Pokal (Bremen Cup) wins in 1993 and 2003 led to the club's participation in the DFB-Pokal (German Cup) where they were eliminated in the first round on both occasions. In 2008, a third Bremer Pokal win again put the team into the German Cup tournament where they beat TuS Koblenz in the opening round before being eliminated by VfL Wolfsburg.

Before the end of the 2012–13 Regionalliga season, the club went bankrupt and following re-organisation was given a place in the sixth tier Landesliga 2013–14. Another relegation next which saw them concede the most goals (169) and earn the fewest points (5) in their existence dropped them to the seventh tier Bezirksliga. A championship in the Bezirksliga in 2015 took the club back up to the Landesliga where another title meant promotion to the Bremen-Liga.

Current squad

Honours
The club's honours:
 Bremen-Liga (V)
 Champions: 1996, 2006, 2012, 2020
 Landesliga Bremen (VI)
 Champions: 1994, 2016
 Bezirksliga Bremen
 Champions: 1993, 2015
 Kreisliga A Bremen
 Champions: 1992
 Bremer Pokal (Tiers III-VI)
 Winners: 1993, 2003, 2008, 2009, 2010, 2011, 2012, 2019, 2020

Stadium
The team plays its home matches in the Sportpark Vinnenweg, which has a capacity of 3,500.

Former coaches
Mike Barten
Torsten Gütschow
Wolfgang Sidka
Kristian Arambasic

References

External links
 
 Oberneuland Dragons
Das deutsche Fußball-Archiv historical German domestic league tables (in German)

 
Football clubs in Germany
Football clubs in Bremen (state)
Association football clubs established in 1948
1948 establishments in Germany